New Fragility is the sixth studio album by American indie rock band Clap Your Hands Say Yeah. The album was self-released on February 12, 2021.

Release
On October 14, 2020, lead vocalist Alec Ounsworth announced the release of the sixth studio album, along with two singles "Hesitating Nation" and "Thousand Oaks". In a press release, Ounsworth explained the meaning of "Thousand Oaks": "In 2018, there was a shooting in Thousand Oaks, CA which killed 13 people. This song has to do with the impotence of the American government in the face of such tragedies."

The third single "Where They Perform Miracles" was released on December 18, 2020.

Critical reception
New Fragility was met with "generally favorable" reviews from critics. At Metacritic, which assigns a weighted average rating out of 100 to reviews from mainstream publications, this release received an average score of 72 based on 9 reviews. At AnyDecentMusic?, the release was given a 6.9 out of 10 based on 10 reviews.

Matt Collar of AllMusic gave the release four stars out of five, explaining "Recorded and produced by Ounsworth in Austin, Texas with some additional production by Will Johnson, New Fragility is a poetic, deeply personal album that finds Ounsworth searching for an ever-deeper sense of meaning in what often feels like an increasingly tumultuous and fragile world." Reviewing the album for DIY, Chris Hamilton-Peach was heavily critical, noting: "New Fragility strives for structure, toggling between social awareness and slack harmonies in an interplay that never fully attains the unity it craves. Winding orchestral flights propel Innocent Weight, in part redeeming an effort that covers little in the way of new ground, while timely lyrical takes command attention yet lack the frequency to shake off neighbouring songs sinking under their own unwieldy mass. Ian Cohen of Pitchfork wrote: "Alec Ounsworth's latest album is a world of divorce, substance abuse, callous indifference to murder, and also bittersweet nostalgia for that bygone indie-rock era that gave him a platform in the first place."

Track listing

Personnel
Credits adapted from AllMusic.

Musicians
 Alec Ounsworth – vocals, bass, guitar, piano
 Will Johnson – drums, guitar
 Jonas Oesterle – drums
 Jaron Olevsky – drums
 Britton Beisenherz – bass
 Carolina Diazgronados – cello
 Veronica Jurkiewicz – viola
 Carlos Santiago – violin
 Gabriel Miller – violin

Technical
 Alec Ounsworth – engineer, producer
 Greg Calbi – mastering
 Will Johnson – producer
 Matthew Poirier – engineer
 Britton Beisenherz – engineer
 Brendan Cooney – string arrangement
 John Agnello − mixing
Production
 Claire Kimock – design
 Beth Ounsworth – cover art

References

2021 albums
Clap Your Hands Say Yeah albums